Alexis Cole is an American jazz singer.

Career
Cole was born in Queens, New York. Her father and grandmother were both jazz singers and pianists. She grew up in South Florida, where she studied Musical Theater at the New World School of the Arts in Miami. While in her senior year there, she began her professional career performing at a hotel in South Beach. This got her interested in singing Jazz. She attended the University of Miami but in her Junior year transferred to William Paterson University where she received her Bachelors of Music in 1998

Directly after college, she was an AmeriCorps volunteer for one year, and then went to study music in Mumbai, India with the Jazz India Vocal Institute.  

From 2000 to 2005 she traveled extensively in Europe, busking and hitchhiking.  Her blog well documents this interesting time.  

Her debut album, Very Early (1999), was recorded with Harry Pickens and independently released, and her second album, Nearer the Sun (2004) was recorded with Ben Stivers. 

In 2006, she received a Masters of Music from Queens College. She taught for one semester at a program in Quito, Ecuador, run by the Berklee College of Music.

Cole spent most of the next two years singing and playing piano at a lounge in Tokyo, Japan. 

In 2009 she enlisted in the U.S. Army to become the lead singer for the West Point Band's Jazz Knights Big Band until 2015. 

In 2016, she released a tribute to Paul Simon entitled Dazzling Blue, which debuted at No. 24 on the Billboard jazz chart.

After leaving the Army she became the Jazz Voice Professor at the State University of New York at Purchase. Some of her notable students are Samara Joy McLendon, who won the Sarah Vaughan Competition in 2019, and Lucy Wijnands who was a Downbeat Award Winner in 2020 and winner of the 2020 Ella Fitzgerald Competition.  

In 2021 she took on a second position as Jazz Voice Professor at her alma mater William Paterson University.  

In May 2020, amidst social distancing due to the Coronavirus Pandemic, she founded an online educational website www.jazzvoice.com to connect vocalists and students for virtual learning opportunities.  Some of the singers teaching on the site include Karrin Allyson, Tierney Sutton, Cyrille Aimée, Kate McGarry, Jane Monheit, John Proulx, Jay Clayton, Dena DeRose and Catherine Russell.  

In April of 2021 along with the Z Theater, she co produced the first annual Virginia Beach Vocal Jazz Summit.    

In November 2021 she released Sky Blossom: Songs From My Tour of Duty, a Big Band album composed of the arrangements by Scott Arcangel that were written for her during her time in the West Point Band.

Discography 
 Very Early (CD Baby, 1999) with Harry Pickens
 Nearer the Sun (Canopy Jazz, 2004)
 Zingaro (Canopy Jazz, 2007)
 Someday My Prince Will Come (Venus, 2009)
 The Greatest Gift: Songs of the Season (Motema 2009)
 You'd Be So Nice to Come Home to (Venus, 2010)
 I Carry Your Heart (Motema, 2012)
 Close Your Eyes (Venus, 2014)
 A Kiss in the Dark (Chesky, 2014)
 A Beautiful Friendship with Bucky Pizzarelli (Venus, 2015)
 Dazzling Blue: The Music of Paul Simon (Chesky, 2016)
 Sky Blossom: Songs From My Tour of Duty (Zoho, 2021)
 The Greatest Gift: Songs of the Season (MNRK, 2021) – re-release with bonus material

References

External links
Official site

Living people
1976 births
American women jazz singers
American jazz singers
Chesky Records artists
Venus Records artists
21st-century American singers
21st-century American women singers
Motéma Music artists